Coe is a surname of English origin. At the time of the British Census of 1881, its frequency was highest in Northamptonshire (8.9 times the British average), followed by Norfolk, Cambridgeshire, Suffolk, Essex, Leicestershire, Huntingdonshire, Surrey, London and Kent. Notable people with the surname include:

Alexander Paul Coe (born 1969), better known by his stage name Sasha, Welsh DJ
Barry Coe (born 1934), actor
Charles Robert "Charlie" Coe (1923–2001) was an American golfer 
Christine Sadler Coe (1902–1983), American journalist
Cornelius Coe (born 1975), American football player
David Coe (disambiguation), multiple people
Douglas Coe (1928–2017), director of The Fellowship Christian organization
Dawn Coe-Jones (1960–2016), Canadian golfer
Edwin Coe (1840–1909), American newspaper editor and politician
Ernest F. Coe (1866–1951), American landscape designer 
Frank Coe (1851–1931), was an Old West cowboy, and for a time, gunman in the company of Billy the Kid, as a member of the Lincoln County Regulators.
Frank Coe, (1907–1980) American Treasury official, and suspected Soviet spy who fled to China
Hank Coe (1946–2021), American politician
Henry Waldo Coe (1857–1927), American frontier physician and politician
George Coe (1856–1941), was an Old West cowboy and for a time gunman alongside Billy the Kid during the Lincoln County War.
George Coe (1929–2015), American actor
George Coe (Michigan politician) (1811–1869), American politician, Lt. Governor of Michigan
Gideon Coe (born 1967), British radio presenter
Jack Coe (1918–1956), American tent evangelist
Jo-Anne L. Coe (1933–2002), American federal official
John D. Coe (1755–1824), New York politician
John W. Coe (1839–1890), New York politician
Jonas Coe (1805–1864), also known as Juan Coe, Uruguayan/Argentinian naval officer
Jonathan Coe (born 1961), British novelist
Kevin Coe (born 1947), convicted rapist from Spokane, Washington
Mary (Mai) Huttleston Rogers Coe, wife of William Robertson Coe
Michael D. Coe (1929–2019), American anthropologist
Natalie Mai Vitetti (née Coe) (1910–1987), daughter of William Rogers Coe
Nathan Coe (born 1984), Australian soccer player
Nick Coe (born 1998), American football player
Paul Coe (born c. 1949), Indigenous Australian rights activist
Peter Coe (1919–2008), Athletics coach; father of Sebastian Coe
Peter Coe (1929–1987), English theatre director
Richard Coe (1914–1995), American theatre critic
Robert Coe (colonist) (1596–1689), Puritan
Robert Douglas Coe, British ambassador
Ron Coe (1933–1988), English professional cyclist
Sebastian Coe (born 1956), British athlete and politician
Sue Coe (born 1951), English artist and illustrator
Tony Coe (born 1934), musician
Tucker Coe, a pseudonym of American writer Donald E. Westlake
Tyler Coe, Rooster Teeth personality and host of the Sportsball podcast
William Robertson Coe (1869–1955), American businessman
William Rogers Coe (1901–1971), American businessman

References

Surnames of English origin